The 9th was held at BAFTA(British Academy of Film and Television Arts) on 22 June 2000. The host was Michael Mansfield QC.

2000 saw the introduction of a new award, the "Global Award for Human Rights Journalism" for an outstanding article in the written media anywhere in the world.

In total there were 8 awards: Global Award for Human Rights Journalism, National Print, Periodicals, Photojournalism, Radio, Special Award for Human Rights Journalism Under Threat, Television Documentary and Television News. Kate Allen, Director of Amnesty International UK said: "These awards recognise the important role of the media in exposing violations, as well as telling the inspiring stories of people struggling against the odds to realise human rights."

The "Special Award for Human Rights Journalism Under Threat" was presented to Ignacio Gómez for his high-risk reporting on organized crime, corruption, and paramilitary groups.

The inaugural "Global Award for Human Rights Journalism" was presented to Palagummi Sainath for his work in The Hindu newspaper "A dalit goes to court". Sainath showed in great detail the unconstitutional and systemic human rights abuse against over 170 Million dalits, the manifestation of rape culture in India, how dalit (lower caste) women were denied human rights and access to justice. He showed how access to the legal systems was blocked with victims made to pay "Two hundred and twenty rupees entry fee", to enter the police station to lodge a criminal report - First Information Report (FIR). Sainath's work showed how the combinations of status, poverty and education empowered exploitation and institutional failure. A most telling comment was "All the judges of the Supreme Court do not have the power of a single police constable".

The Judges in all categories were Nick Clarke, Daljit Dhaliwal, Mark Lattimer, Francine Stock, Greg Whitmore, and Peter Wilby.

Shortlist and Awards 2000

See also

Notes

Further reading

 Palagummi Sainath (1996). Everybody Loves a Good Drought: Stories from India's Poorest Districts. Penguin Group India. .

References

External links
 Amnesty International UK (AIUK) website
 Amnesty International UK Media Awards at the AIUK Website
 Amnesty International Website

Amnesty International
Human rights awards
British journalism awards
2000 awards in the United Kingdom
June 2000 events in the United Kingdom